José Bokung Alogo (born 31 December 1987), also known as Colin, is an Equatoguinean footballer who plays as a defender for local club Deportivo Unidad. He was a member of the Equatorial Guinea national team.

International career
Colin has been international with the Equatorial Guinea national football team, at least, in a World Cup 2010 Qualifying match against South Africa and in four friendly matches (against Cape Verde, Mali, Estonia, Chad, Gambia and Guinea-Bissau).

He played also in unofficial matches at the 2008 (two matches), 2009 and 2010 CEMAC Cup (two matches) and in six friendlies (vs. the Brazilian club Cruzeiro, the French side RSC Montreuil, Brittany, France U-20, OGC Nice and the UNFP team).

Notes

References

External links

1987 births
Living people
People from Ebibeyin
Equatoguinean footballers
Association football fullbacks
Renacimiento FC players
Deportivo Mongomo players
Equatorial Guinea youth international footballers
Equatorial Guinea international footballers
2012 Africa Cup of Nations players